The Longueuil City Council (in French: Conseil municipal de la Ville de Longueuil) is the governing body of the mayor–council government in the city of Longueuil on Montreal's south shore, located in the Montérégie region of Quebec, Canada.

Council meetings are held on the third Tuesday of every month at 7 p.m.

Mayor

Composition

Council President
Reine Bombo-Allara

Councillors
As of the 2021 Quebec municipal elections

Le Vieux-Longueuil

Greenfield Park

Saint-Hubert

See also
Longueuil
Urban agglomeration of Longueuil
Boroughs of Longueuil
List of mayors of Longueuil
Greenfield Park, Quebec
Le Vieux-Longueuil
Saint-Hubert, Quebec

References

External links
Longueuil City Council page
Official Longueuil municipal site 

Municipal councils in Quebec
Politics of Longueuil